Mga Mumunting Lihim (Those Little Secrets)  is a 2012 Filipino drama film by Jose Javier Reyes. The film tells the story of four female friends and the secrets behind their friendship. It is one of the official entries for the Director's Showcase category in the Cinemalaya 2012.

Synopsis
Mariel, a housewife who died from cancer, left a box full of her diaries through the years to her best friend, Carly, an advertising executive. Though Sandra and Olive warned her not to read the diaries, she could not resist knowing what was written on those. Soon, all the hidden stories ruined their friendship.

Cast
Judy Ann Santos as Mariel
Iza Calzado as Carly
Agot Isidro as Sandra
Janice de Belen as Olive

Awards
2012
8th Cinemalaya Independent Film Festival
Best Editing 
Best Screenplay
Best Actress and Supporting Actress (the ensemble)
Nominated-Best Film

References

External links
 

Philippine drama films
2012 films